Dimitri Daeseleire (born 18 May 1990 in Antwerp) is a Belgian football player who plays as a right back. He is currently playing for Londerzeel in the Belgian Division 2.

Career

Club
He began his career at Lierse, moving to the youth squad of Genk in June 2006. In January 2008 he made his debut for the first team of Genk in the Belgian First Division.

International
He was a member for the Belgium U-17 team at 2007 FIFA U-17 World Cup in South Korea and played 3 games. He was the captain of Belgium's U17 team, and played together with Eden Hazard and Christian Benteke.

Honours
Genk
Belgian Cup: 2008–09

References

External links

1990 births
Living people
Belgian footballers
Belgium youth international footballers
K.R.C. Genk players
Association football defenders
Lierse S.K. players
Sint-Truidense V.V. players
Royal Antwerp F.C. players
Oud-Heverlee Leuven players
K. Rupel Boom F.C. players
K.S.V. Roeselare players
Belgian Pro League players
Challenger Pro League players